I Can See Your Voice is a Philippine television mystery music game show series based on the South Korean program of the same name. It features a group of "mystery singers", with the objective of guest artist(s) are to eliminate potential bad singers, assisted by clues and celebrity panelists; and the game ends with a duet between the last remaining mystery singer and one of the guest artist(s).

Overall, the series has played 223 guest artists that aired five seasons and 220 episodes on four different networks — ABS-CBN (from its debut on September 16, 2017 to March 14, 2020); Kapamilya Channel, A2Z (from October 24, 2020 to present); and TV5 (from March 11, 2023 to present). In the milestones, Yassi Pressman and Sam Concepcion played in the 100th episode on September 30, 2018; and host Luis Manzano and Jay Durias played in the 200th episode on April 23 and 24, 2022.

Unlike other local adaptations that air seasons on one-game weekly episodes, the Philippine counterpart is unique known for back-to-back games that airs on separate episodes. Also, the inaugural first season did air 128 episodes, making it the longest season in ICSYV franchise by episode count. It also aired the first episodes with an entire lineup of celebrities, pairs, groups, elderly, and foreigners as mystery singers.

Series overview

Episodes

Season 1 (2017—19)

Season 2 (2019—20)

Season 3 (2020—21)

Season 4 (2022)

Season 5 (2023)

Specials

Notes

References

I Can See Your Voice (Philippine game show)
Lists of Philippine television series episodes